Seon Manley (January 7, 1921 –  March 11, 2009), was an American editor and author who worked with her sister Gogo Lewis. She worked with the supernatural, tales of suspense, and horror as well as biographies.

Biography
Janet Helen Givens was born in Connecticut on January 7, 1921 to Webster Crane Givens and Carolyn McLean. Her degree was from Wellesley College. Her mother died while she was young and she and her sister were sent to live with their grandparents in New York for a time. She became the advertising manager for the publishing house Vanguard Press.  Manley began editing books for Vanguard, including critical works like those by Eugene Jolas. Manley also edited anthologies of horror stories, mostly with her sister Gogo Lewis. Edward Gorey created the covers for eight of these from 1973 to 1979. Manley also wrote about the places and people she encountered and various times in her life in a series of mostly autobiographical books.  With her husband she edited a book on The Age of the Manager which went with his consulting company. They also created books on the history of a selection of beaches and islands and the people involved in them. Manley in 2009. Her husband was Robert Russell Manley Jr, with whom she had a daughter Shivaun.

Bibliography

Books
 Long Island Discovery: An Adventure Into the History, Manners, and Mores of America's Front Porch, 1966
 Dorothy and William Wordsworth : the heart of a circle of friends, 1974
 Rudyard Kipling: Creative Adventurer, 1965
 Nathaniel Hawthorne; captain of the imagination, 1968
 My Heart's in the Heather, 1968
 Beaches: their lives, legends, and lore, 1968
 Islands: their lives, legends, and lore, 1970

Anthologies
The Ghost in the Far Garden, and Other Stories, 1977
 Magic!: A Treasury for Young Readers, 1967
 Shapes of the Supernatural, 1969
 A Gathering of Ghosts, 1970
 Ladies of Horror: Two Centuries of Supernatural Stories by the Gentle Sex, 1971
 Mistresses of Mystery: Two Centuries of Suspense Stories by the Gentle Sex, 1973
 Baleful Beasts, 1974
 Bewitched Beings, 1974
 Ladies of Fantasy: Two Centuries of Sinister Stories by the Gentle Sex, 1975
 Ladies of the Gothics, 1975
 Masters of the Macabre, 1975
 Women of the Weird: Eerie Stories by the Gentle Sex, 1976
 Sisters of Sorcery, 1976
 Ghostly Gentlewomen: Two Centuries of Spectral Stories By the Gentle Sex, 1977
 Christmas Ghosts, 1978
 Masters of Shades and Shadows: An Anthology of Great Ghost Stories, 1978
 Nature's Revenge: Eerie Stories of Revolt Against the Human Race, 1978
 Fun Phantoms: Tales of Ghostly Entertainment, 1979
 The Haunted Dolls, 1980

Short fiction
 Yes, My Darling Daughter, 1976
 Letter from Massachusetts: 1688, 1976
 The Most Beautiful Birds in the World, 1978
 The Christmas of the Big Bisque Doll, 1980

References and sources

1921 births
2009 deaths
20th-century American women writers
American editors
Anthologists
Wellesley College alumni
21st-century American women